In enzymology, a monosialoganglioside sialyltransferase is an enzyme that catalyzes the chemical reaction

CMP-N-acetylneuraminate + D-galactosyl-N-acetyl-D-galactosaminyl-(N-acetylneuraminyl)-D-galactosyl-D-glucosylceramide  CMP + N-acetylneuraminyl-D-galactosyl-N-acetyl-D-galactosaminyl-(N-acetylneuraminyl)-D-galactosyl-D-glucosylceramide

The 2 substrates of this enzyme are CMP-N-acetylneuraminate and D-galactosyl-N-acetyl-D-galactosaminyl-(N-acetylneuraminyl)-D-galactosyl-D-glucosylceramide, whereas its 2 products are CMP and N-acetylneuraminyl-D-galactosyl-N-acetyl-D-galactosaminyl-(N-acetylneuraminyl)-D-galactosyl-D-glucosylceramide.

This enzyme belongs to the family of transferases, specifically those glycosyltransferases that do not transfer hexosyl or pentosyl groups. The systematic name of this enzyme class is CMP-N-acetylneuraminate:D-galactosyl-N-acetyl-D-galactosaminyl-(N-ac etylneuraminyl)-D-galactosyl-D-glucosylceramide N-acetylneuraminyltransferase.

References

EC 2.4.99
Enzymes of unknown structure